Hunting and fishing in Alaska are common both for recreation and subsistence.

Hunting

Alaska is a popular hunting destination.  Hunters come from all over the world to hunt big game animals such as the brown bear, black bear, moose, and caribou.  Mountain goat hunts are also quickly becoming a rising interest to hunters. The reason as to why Alaska is such a popular hunting destination is because it is home to some of the world’s largest big game animals. Alaska’s species of brown bear and moose are the largest in the world.  According to the Boone and Crockett Club, Alaska has a rich history of world record brown bear, moose, and caribou, taken by various hunters.   Hunters are able to partake in an Alaskan hunt by obtaining hunting licenses and game tags, and also following the areas laws and regulations.   The most common weapons among hunters are rifles, large handguns, and bows.

Fishing

A greater percentage of Alaskans fish than residents of any other state. Alaska features several different types of fishing. The two most popular are salmon fishing and halibut fishing. Homer claims the title of “halibut fishing capital of the world.” Other common types of fishing are deep sea fishing, fly fishing, and ice fishing. Fishermen have a variety of fish that they can catch including: salmon, various species of trout, northern pike, arctic char, dolly varden, and grayling. Alaska Fishing Licenses are required by law in Alaska for both residents and non-residents.

See also
List of lakes in Alaska
List of rivers in Alaska
Aquaculture in Alaska

References

Hunting in the United States
Fishing in the United States
Sports in Alaska
Tourism in Alaska